Independencia is a department of La Rioja Province (Argentina).

History 
This law also established Patquía as the head town.

Geography 
The department has 7,120 km² and borders to the north with the departments of Capital, Chilecito and Coronel Felipe Varela, to the east with the department of Angel Vicente Peñaloza, to the west with the province of San Juan and to the south with the department of Facundo Quiroga.

Gallery

References 

Departments of La Rioja Province, Argentina